Jo Byeong-hyeon (born 1932) is a South Korean basketball player. He competed in the men's tournament at the 1956 Summer Olympics.

References

1932 births
Living people
South Korean men's basketball players
Olympic basketball players of South Korea
Basketball players at the 1956 Summer Olympics
Basketball players from Seoul